Augert is a surname. Notable people with the surname include:

 Jean-Noël Augert (born 1949), French alpine skier
 Jean-Pierre Augert (1946–1976), French alpine skier, uncle of Jean-Noël